Wayne Thomson is a Canadian politician who previously served as the mayor of Niagara Falls. He served two separate terms in the office, from 1978 to 1983 and from 1991 to 2003.

In 1983, Thomson resigned as mayor amid controversy over a vacation given as a gift by a Toronto development firm, and a land purchase made by his then-fiancé Bonnie Dickson. His fiancé bought some land in Niagara Falls from a seller who did not want it to be sold to Marineland. Seven months later, she sold the plot to Marineland. Marineland owner John Holer stated she acted as trustee and was accompanied by Thomson when the arrangements were made.

Thomson was defeated by Ted Salci in the 2003 municipal election. He subsequently ran and won re-election to Niagara Falls City Council as an councillor in the 2010 municipal election.

References 

Mayors of Niagara Falls, Ontario
Living people
Niagara Falls, Ontario city councillors
Year of birth missing (living people)